Vinegar Hill is a mountain located in Greene County, New York west of Lexington, New York. Located to the west is Vly Mountain and to the south Beech Ridge. Vinegar Hill drains north into Schoharie Creek and south into Roarback Brook.

References

Mountains of Greene County, New York
Mountains of New York (state)